The Charlemont pub attacks were co-ordinated militant Loyalist paramilitary attacks on two pubs in the small village of Charlemont, County Armagh, Northern Ireland, carried out by the Ulster Volunteer Force (UVF) on the 15 May 1976. The attacks have been attributed to the Glenanne gang which was a coalition of right-wing Loyalist paramilitaries and subversive members inside the Royal Ulster Constabulary (RUC), the Ulster Defense Regiment (UDR) and the British Army.

Background
Since late 1975 there had been a number of deadly sectarian attacks carried out by both Irish Republican and Loyalist paramilitaries in County Armagh.
On 15 December, 17 year old Catholic civilian Ronald Trainor, a member of the Irish Republican Socialist Party (believed to be the political wing of the Irish National Liberation Army), was killed by the UVF in Portadown. On the 19 December 1975 the Loyalist Red Hand Commando claimed responsibility for killing three Catholic civilians in a pub in Silverbridge, County Armagh. On the 31 December the Irish National Liberation Army using the covername "Armagh People's Republican Army" killed three Protestant civilians when they bombed a pub near Portadown.
At the start of January 1976 Loyalists gunmen killed six Catholic civilians in a double attack in County Armagh. The next day a group calling itself the South Armagh Republican Action Force killed 10 Protestant civilian workmen in what became known as the Kingsmill massacre.

Attacks
Locals claimed that the Ulster Defence Regiment (UDR) had been patrolling the village for a number of nights beforehand, but were absent the night of the attacks.

On the night of the 15 May 1976 at around 10:50 pm the Eagles Bar in Charlemont in Armagh was sprayed with gunfire from a Sten submachine gun, four people had been hit and injured in the attack. Probably more would have been injured but the owner of the bar placed security shutters on the windows in case of an attack. One of those who was injured was Fred McLoughlin (47) who died two weeks later in hospital from his injuries.
Almost instantly after the gunfire had stopped a loud bang was heard, this was the bomb that had gone off at Clancy's bar only a short distance away.
The bomb had been placed at the front of the pubs door by the UVF unit and exploded right after the attack on the other pub had ended. The force of the blast brought the ceiling crashing down on the people inside the pub. Three people were killed in this bomb attack including Sean O'Hagan (22), Robert McCullough (41) and the pubs owner Felix "Vincy" Clancy (54) the pubs owner who had only just returned from the Eagle Bar a few minutes earlier. About 15 people had been injured in the attack, some of them seriously.

Aftermath
A member of the British Territorial Army Gerald Beattie and British UDR soldier David Kane were convicted of the shooting at the Eagle's Bar, and a RUC reservist Joseph Lutton for the bombing at Clancy's Bar, although Lutton named Beattie and Kane as having also taken part in the bombing at Clancy's they were given no further time on to their sentences or even interviewed about the bombing.

Two days after the Charlemont attacks the Republican Action Force claimed responsibility for killing Protestant civilians Robert and Thomas Dobson in Moy, County Tyrone, apparently in retaliation for the 15 May pub attacks.

See also

Donnelly's Bar and Kay's Tavern attacks
Reavey and O'Dowd killings
Castleblayney bombing
Hillcrest Bar bombing
Glenanne gang
Loughinisland massacre
Timeline of Ulster Volunteer Force actions

References

Explosions in 1976
Royal Ulster Constabulary
The Troubles in County Armagh
1976 crimes in the United Kingdom
1976 in Northern Ireland
Improvised explosive device bombings in Northern Ireland
Terrorist incidents in the United Kingdom in 1976
1976 crimes in Ireland
Mass murder in 1976
Terrorist incidents in Northern Ireland
Deaths by firearm in Northern Ireland
People killed by security forces during The Troubles (Northern Ireland)
People killed by the Ulster Volunteer Force
Police misconduct in Northern Ireland
Spree shootings in Northern Ireland
May 1976 events in the United Kingdom
1970s mass shootings in the United Kingdom
Attacks on bars in Northern Ireland
1976 mass murder in Europe
1976 murders in the United Kingdom
1970s murders in Northern Ireland